Peruvian Civil War may refer to the following:

 Peruvian Civil War of 1834
 Peruvian Civil War of 1835–1836
 Peruvian Civil War of 1843–1844
 Peruvian Civil War of 1856–1858
 Peruvian Civil War of 1865
 Peruvian Civil War of 1867
 Salt tax revolt (Peru)
 Peruvian Civil War of 1884–1885
 Peruvian Civil War of 1894–1895
 Internal conflict in Peru (1980–current)